Ben-Gay is an unincorporated community in Sharp County, Arkansas, United States.

References

Unincorporated communities in Sharp County, Arkansas
Unincorporated communities in Arkansas